Tasmanophlebi is a genus of insect in family Siphlonuridae. It contains the following species:
 Tasmanophlebi lacuscoerulei

Mayfly genera
Taxonomy articles created by Polbot